Microsoft Corporation has been selling branded hardware since 1980, and developing devices in-house since 1982, when the Microsoft Hardware division was formed to design a computer mouse for use with Microsoft Word for DOS. Since then, Microsoft has developed computer hardware, gaming hardware and mobile hardware. It also produced drivers and other software for integrating the hardware with Microsoft Windows.

Products

 ActiMates toys
 Azure Kinect
 Digital Sound System 80 speakers
 Microsoft Band smartbands
 Microsoft Broadband Networking networking products
 Microsoft Cordless Phone System phones
 Microsoft Fingerprint Reader biometric readers
 Microsoft HoloLens smartglasses
 Microsoft Keyboard keyboards
 Microsoft Kin mobile phones
 Microsoft LifeCam webcams
 Microsoft LifeChat headsets
 Microsoft Lumia smartphones
 Microsoft MacEnhancer
 Microsoft Mach 20 accelerator board
 Microsoft Mouse computer mice
 Microsoft Response Point business telephone systems
 Microsoft RoundTable videoconferencing devices
 Microsoft SideWinder game controllers
 Microsoft Surface tablet PCs
 Microsoft wireless display adapters
 Nokia 3-digit series feature phones
 Xbox accessories
 Xbox game controllers
 Xbox video game consoles
 Z-80 SoftCard coprocessor card
 Zune portable media players

See also
 Computer hardware

References

External links
 Windows hardware dev center
 The good, bad and ugly history of Microsoft hardware